Haji Bani Mosque (-Hacı Bani məscidi) is one of the mosques of Azerbaijan, was built in the 16th century. It is located in Old City, Baku.

History and facts 
The mosque is a part of Shirvan Shah complex. According to an Arabic inscription the mosque was built by Haji Bani in the 16th century. The large multi-tiered mihrab is located opposite the entrance. The mosque has a dome.

The mosque was reconstructed early in the 20th century. During reconstruction a prayer room for women and lobby were added. Interior and exterior concepts were built in the national traditional architectural style. Specifically, the domes are a cone-like shape that is the typical Absheron dome.

According to the decree of the Cabinet of Azerbaijan, Haci Bani Mosque is a historical monument of national importance.

See also
 Islam in Azerbaijan
 List of mosques in Azerbaijan

References 

Mosques in Baku
Icherisheher